Resorcylic acid is a type of dihydroxybenzoic acid. It may refer to:

3,5-Dihydroxybenzoic acid (α-Resorcylic acid)
 2,4-Dihydroxybenzoic acid (β-Resorcylic acid)
 2,6-Dihydroxybenzoic acid (γ-Resorcylic acid)

Dihydroxybenzoic acids